The Employment Relations Act 1999 (c 26) is an Act of Parliament of the United Kingdom. It made significant amendments in UK labour law to the Trade Union and Labour Relations (Consolidation) Act 1992.

Provisions

Trade unions
Sections 1 to 6 concern changes implementing a new statutory procedure for employers to recognise and collectively bargain with a trade union, in any business with over 20 employees. Section 1 and Schedule 1 achieves this by amending the Trade Union and Labour Relations (Consolidation) Act 1992 and inserting a new section 70A and Schedule A1, which sets out the statutory recognition procedure.

Section 2 and Schedule 2 amended TULRCA 1992 to require that union members are not subject to any detriment short of dismissal for attempts to organise.

Section 3 allows the Secretary of State to make regulations prohibiting any blacklisting of union members.

Sections 4 and Schedule 3 amends the provisions in TULRCA 1992 relating to ballots before industrial action. Section 5 implements TULRCA 1992 sections 70B and 70C, which enhances the rights employees have to workplace training. Section 6 ensures that union members have a right to claim for unfair dismissal connected with the statutory recognition procedure.

Leave for family and domestic reasons
Sections 7 to 9 allowed employees to receive at least 3 months unpaid leave for the purpose of caring for a child. Mothers can have up to 18 weeks paid maternity leave.

Disciplinary and grievance hearings
Section 10 creates a right for employees to be accompanied to disciplinary or grievance meetings by a companion of their choice provided that the chosen companion is a member of one of the following categories:

 a paid official of a trade union;
 an unpaid official of a trade union who is certified as competent to act as a companion; or
 another of the employer's workers.

Where an employer refuses to allow the employee to be accompanied in this way the employee may present a claim in an Employment Tribunal and be entitled to limited financial compensation.

In certain circumstances a failure to permit accompaniment may also amount to a breach of the implied contractual term that an employer will not without reasonable or proper cause conduct itself in such a way that is calculated or likely to destroy or seriously damage the relationship of trust and confidence that exists between an employer and its employee.

Other rights of individuals
Section 16 to 23 cover other individual employment rights. Section 23 the Secretary of State has the power to explicitly include categories of workers within the scope of employment protection legislation. Conspicuously, the minister has not done this for agency workers.

CAC, ACAS, Commissioners and Certification Officer
Sections 24 to 29 cover changes in rules concerning the Central Arbitration Committee, ACAS the commissioners and certification officers.

Miscellaneous
Sections 30 to 41 concern a variety of unrelated amendments to various previous laws.

Section 31 implements Schedule 7, which changed the rules on fees under the Employment Agencies Act 1973.

General
Sections 42 to 47 concern general provisions.

See also
Employment Relations Act
Employment Rights Act 1996

External links

1999 in British law
United Kingdom Acts of Parliament 1999
United Kingdom labour law
British trade unions history
Trade union legislation